The Risk Warning System is a vehicle safety project designed by Can Akgun, a mechanical engineer in Turkey.  The Risk Warning System was awarded the 1st place prize in the Automotive Project Contest 2012 for the safety category.

The system has the ability to detect the faulty and risky actions done by the driver using variety of cameras, sensors, radars and existing auxiliary safety systems. Once the faults are detected and analysed, the driver is warned visually and audibly. The surrounding drivers are warned by the vehicle showing the type of the fault and risks taken through wireless technology. These accidental risks are also recorded instantly so that the system can score the drivers driving ability. The data may also be used as a black box by having the ability to record every risk taken by aggressive driving, zig-zag driving, U-Turns, accidental overtaking, exceeding the speed limits, and other risky actions milliseconds before an accident.

The traffic rule violations may be reported by police traffic branches, insurance companies or anyone allowed to display the risk data via the Internet. The logic of the system may be used in autonomous cars. The system is expected to be implemented to cars when the research and development studies are finalized.

References 

"Turkey Automotive Project Competition 2012" http://www.otomotivtasarimyarismasi.com/P2012/2012
"Turkey Ministry of Economics, Turkish Exporters Assembly, Automotive Exporters Assembly" partners of the project contest.17–18 May 2012, Halic Congress Center, http://www.uib.org.tr/tr/aktuel-uibden-haberler-otomotiv-proje-pazari-ve-tasarim-yarismasinda-gelecegin-otomobillerini-yaratacak-fikirler-yaristi-oduller-turkiyenin-dort-yanina-dagildi.html
Spacecope Design News, http://www.spacecope.com/1-otomotiv-proje-pazari-tasarim-yarismasi-kazanan-projeler/

Vehicle safety technologies